Thomas Alva Edison School is a private school located in Caguas, Puerto Rico.

The school was founded in 1966. It began as a Catholic school, but became a secular school in 1992.

The school's mascot is the red Cardinal, which represents their three varsity teams: basketball, volleyball, and soccer.

References

External links
 TAESPR site
 

1966 establishments in Puerto Rico
Private schools in Puerto Rico
Educational institutions established in 1966
Caguas, Puerto Rico